The 1965 KFK competitions in Ukraine were part of the 1965 Soviet KFK competitions that were conducted in the Soviet Union. It was the second season of KFK in Ukraine. The winner was not admitted to the 1966 Soviet Second League (1966 Ukrainian Class B).

Teams
From last season ceased their participation in the competition 15 teams out of 26.
 Debut: Metalurh Sevastopol, Lokomotyv Kherson, Avanhard Kremenchuk, Shakhtar Lysychansk, Lokomotyv Kupiansk, Shakhtar Konotop, Avtoskla Kostiantynivka, Spartak Kirovohrad, Avanhard Terny, Lokomotyv Smila, Voskhod Chernivtsi, Syhnal Kotovsk, Vostok Mohyliv-Podilsky, Temp Kyiv, Budivelnyk Chernihiv, Naftovyk Nadvirna, Shakhtar Novovolynsk, Kolhospnyk Berezhany

Group stage

Group 1

Notes:
 Lokomotyv Kherson that played in the 1965 Ukrainian Class B was fielding its reserve team

Group 2

Group 3

Group 4

Group 5

Group 6

Final
Final stage was taking place on 30 October – 5 November 1965 in city of Khust. 

Notes:

Promotion
None of KFK teams were promoted to the 1966 Ukrainian Class B.
 None

However, to the Class B were promoted following teams that did not participate in the KFK competitions:
 FC Torpedo Berdyansk
 FC Azovets Zhdanov
 FC Avanhard Makiivka
 FC Start Dzerzhynsk

References

Ukrainian Football Amateur League seasons
KFK